The First Battle of St Albans was fought on 22 May 1455 at St Albans, 22 miles (35 km) north of London, and traditionally marks the beginning of the Wars of the Roses in England. Richard, Duke of York, and his allies, the Neville earls of Salisbury and Warwick, defeated a royal army commanded by Edmund Beaufort, Duke of Somerset, who was killed. With King Henry VI captured, a subsequent parliament appointed Richard of York Lord Protector.

Background

The incapacitation of Henry VI by mental illness in 1454 led to the recall to court of Richard of York, his closest adult relative. Back in 1447, York had been assigned as Lieutenant of Ireland, basically in exile away from England, and his long-time rival, Edmund Beaufort, Duke of Somerset, the favourite of the King, had been given the charge of the Lieutenancy of France. After Somerset's own failure in France, York unexpectedly returned to London with significant support not only from the nobility, most of whom saw the incompetence of Somerset's efforts in France, but also from the public. He presented himself as a champion of the law and urged the King to have Somerset tried and held accountable for his failures. He also wished to be recognised as heir presumptive to the English throne while Henry VI was childless. York formed an army to force the issue in 1452, and after meeting with the council of war and the King, who desperately wanted to avoid a conflict, York's demands were agreed to. York disbanded his army as a result but was soon arrested and held prisoner for three months. An execution was avoided as the King was nervous about arousing trouble since the Duke of York was very popular and known as a man of honour. York was released only after he had agreed to swear an oath at St Paul's Cathedral that he would never again take up arms against the King.

After the English army, led by Sir John Talbot, 1st Earl of Shrewsbury, was routed in the Battle of Castillion, Henry VI suffered a complete mental breakdown and was unable to perform his royal duties. Somerset had attempted to take control of the country and sought to make himself Lord Protector. However, Somerset underestimated the Duke of York's influence and popularity, as many nobles on the council (including York's closest allies, his brother-in-law Richard Neville, Earl of Salisbury and Salisbury's son Richard, Earl of Warwick) were on York's side. Thus, York was given the appointment to govern England as Lord Protector and First Councillor of the realm while the King remained unfit. He used that position to move against his chief rival, express the bitterness which had accumulated over the years and have the Duke of Somerset imprisoned. It was during those 14 months that the sides were clearly forming. There was conflict beyond that between the Dukes of York and Somerset, who were in fact the two richest and most prominent families from the north, the Percys and Nevilles, were having their own conflicts. The Percys were Earls of Northumberland; the Nevilles possessed both Salisbury and Warwick (received through the right of their wives), and they were one of the richest families in all England. The Nevilles were also related to the Duke of York by marriage, as the Duchess of York was Cecily Neville, the sister of the Earl of Salisbury. Much of the fighting was over land and money, but both were clearly choosing sides, the Percys for Somerset and the Nevilles for York.

By Christmas 1454, King Henry had recovered from his illness, which removed the basis for York's authority. Somerset was released and restored to his former position of power. Having reconvened the court at Westminster by mid-April 1455, Henry and a select council of nobles decided to hold a great council at Leicester. York and his closest allies anticipated that Somerset would bring charges against them at the assembly. They gathered an armed retinue and marched to stop the royal party from reaching Leicester by intercepting it at St Albans.

Prelude 
On 18 May, news reached the King and the Duke of Somerset in London that York and his allies had raised a retinue and were marching south to London down the Great North Road. On Somerset's instructions, Cardinal Thomas Bourchier wrote to them to order them to disband. The Duke of York and the Earls of Warwick and Salisbury authored a letter at Royston on 20 May to insist that they were loyal to the King and had only brought their forces as protection from their enemies. Whether York intended to march on London or capture the King on the road to Leicester is unknown, but Somerset called his allies to St Albans and left London on 21 May, likely for fear of the pro-Yorkist London. Marching to St Albans with their own retainers, the Yorkists wrote a letter directly to the King on 21 May from Ware, where they turned off the Great North Road and began the approach to St Albans. On the night of 21 May, the King and Somerset were at Watford while the Yorkists were camped on the road between Ware and St Albans.

Battle
The Lancastrian army of 2,000 troops arrived at St Albans first, with Humphrey Stafford, Duke of Buckingham, in command, and proceeded to defend it by placing troops along the Tonman Ditch and at the bars in Sopwell Lane and Shropshire Lane. The reassignment of Buckingham from Somerset as Commander of the Army had been a last-minute decision by Henry VI, whether by fear of Somerset's past failures or of animosity towards the Duke of York. The 7,000-strong Yorkist army arrived and camped in Keyfield, to the east. Lengthy negotiations ensued, with heralds moving back and forth between the rival commanders. After a few hours, it was believed in the Yorkist camp that King Henry VI knew nothing of the letters of negotiation.

The Duke of York had made his intentions clear and wanted Somerset punished and then executed. In a message to Henry VI, he stated:

That was dangerous territory in which York was playing, as he was demanding much from the King and setting the rules himself. The very act of displaying such an aggressive front to the King was treasonous, but his popularity kept York confident and supported. In a fit of uncharacteristic regency, Henry refused, replying:

After several hours, Richard, despairing of a peaceful solution, decided to attack. Although his army might have been unwilling to attack King Henry, the Royal Standard was not visible and might even have been negligently propped against a wall by the royal standard-bearer, the Earl of Wiltshire. Most of Henry's forces were surprised by the suddenness of Richard's attack, and most of the army was expecting a peaceful resolution similar to the one at Blackheath in 1452. However, two Yorkist frontal assaults down the narrow streets against the barricades near St Peter's Church, which were commanded by Lord Clifford, made no headway and resulted in heavy casualties for the Yorkists. The entire battle did not last longer than half an hour and was caused mostly by the element of surprise that Warwick placed in charging into the town when the Lancastrians were unprepared.

Warwick led a reserve force through an unguarded part of the town, with back lanes and gardens. Suddenly, the earl appeared in the market square, where the main body of Henry's troops were talking and resting. There is evidence that it was not yet expecting to be involved in the fighting, as many were not even wearing their helmets. Warwick charged instantly with his force and routed the Lancastrians. Somerset, knowing very well that York would never let him live, had sought refuge at the Castle Inn. When the Yorkists surrounded the building, Somerset decided to try to fight his way out. He charged onto the main street, over the bodies of the defenders, and killed four men before he was struck down. The Earl of Northumberland was killed trying to get to the refuge at the Castle Inn. Lord Clifford of Skipton, an ally of Percy, was hacked to death in the main street.

On the earl's orders, his archers then shot at the men surrounding the King and killed several and injured the King and the Duke of Buckingham. The Lancastrians manning the barricades realised the Yorkists had outflanked them and, fearing an attack from behind, abandoned their positions and fled the town.

Aftermath
The First Battle of St Albans was relatively minor in military terms, with fewer than sixty killed from approximately 5,000 combatants, but politically was a complete victory for York and the Nevilles. York had captured the King and restored himself to complete power, and Somerset and the Nevilles' northern rivals Henry Percy, Earl of Northumberland, and Lord Clifford fell during the rout. Among the wounded were Buckingham; Thomas de Courtenay, Earl of Devon; Jasper Tudor (half-brother of the King); and Somerset's son Henry Beaufort, Earl of Dorset. The sudden attack by and bravery of the 26-year-old Earl of Warwick began his famous military career and would lead to his reputation as "the Kingmaker".

The next day, York escorted King Henry back to London and was appointed as Protector of England by the Parliament a few months later.

In literature

Shakespeare's historic play Henry VI, Part 2 ends with the conclusion of the battle.

Trinity (known in the US as Margaret of Anjou), the second book of the Wars of the Roses series by Conn Iggulden, dramatises the battle as a moment of indecision for Richard of York but as a powerful victory for the Neville faction during the Neville-Percy feud.

See also 
History of St Albans
Second Battle of St Albans
Percy-Neville feud

Notes

References

Further reading 
 Burley, Elliott & Watson, The Battles of St Albans, Pen & Sword, 2007, 

1455 in England
St Albans 1455
St Albans
History of St Albans
Military history of Hertfordshire
Henry VI of England